Frankfurt (Main) Taunusanlage station is a train station in the city centre of Frankfurt, Germany. It is served by eight S-Bahn lines (S1–S6, S8, S9).

The station was opened with the first section of the Frankfurt City Tunnel in May 1978. It consists of two tracks, surrounding a central platform.

Name
The name Taunusanlage refers to a section of the now demolished city walls, named in the 19th century after the nearby Taunusbahnhof (Taunus station) of the Taunus Railway.

Location
Taunusanlage station is located in Frankfurt's Westend district, close to Taunusanlage Park and the Bankenviertel, Frankfurt's financial district. Its entrance escalators are next to the Deutsche Bank Twin Towers. The station is a major hub for commuters and is in the immediate vicinity of several major banks.

References

Rhine-Main S-Bahn stations
Railway stations in Germany opened in 1978
Railway stations located underground in Frankfurt